Sharpe's Peril is a 2008 British TV film, usually shown in two parts, which is part of an ITV series based on Bernard Cornwell's historical fiction novels about the English soldier Richard Sharpe during the Napoleonic Wars. Unlike most parts of the TV series, Sharpe's Peril and the preceding Sharpe's Challenge are not based on Cornwell's novels. Both are set in 1817, two years after Sharpe has retired as a farmer in Normandy, so chronologically they come after Sharpe's Assassin (1815) and before Sharpe's Devil (1820–1821). In Sharpe's Challenge and Sharpe's Peril, Sharpe and his comrade-in-arms, Patrick Harper, are called out of retirement and asked to go to India.

Plot 
The story continues from where Sharpe's Challenge left off. On their way home to England, Richard Sharpe (Sean Bean) and Patrick Harper (Daragh O'Malley) reluctantly agree to escort Marie-Angelique Bonnet (Beatrice Rosen) to the hill fort of Kalimgong, where her fiancé, Major Joubert (Pascal Langdale), is stationed. They encounter a baggage train heading to Madras, made up of soldiers from the King's and the East India Company's armies, commanded by the young Ensign Beauclere (Luke Ward-Wilkinson), engineer Major Tredinnick (David Robb), and Subedar Pillai (Rajesh Khattar). Included in the train is a redcoat prisoner named Barabbas (Amit Behl), an Indian princess (Nandana Sen) and her retinue, and Tredinnick's pregnant wife (Caroline Carver).  When the train is attacked by forces of the bandit Chitu, the Subedar is wounded. They are saved by the timely arrival of Colonel Dragomirov (Velibor Topic) and his cavalry squadron. With no one more qualified, Sharpe is forced to take command.

Trouble comes from within the train as well. Sharpe discovers that Barabbas is in fact the son of Obadiah Hakeswill, the man who murdered Sharpe's first wife. Flying into a rage, Sharpe almost kills Barabbas on the spot, stopped only by Harper's intervention. They also face opposition from Colour-Sergeant Wormwood (Steve Speirs), a British soldier who dislikes Sharpe's methods and fosters feelings of resentment among his men, which grows when Sharpe punishes two of Wormwood's men for drunkenness and attempted rape.

Arriving at Kalimgong, Sharpe and Harper find the entire garrison killed, with the exception of the fort's commander, General Sir Henry Simmerson (Michael Cochrane), Sharpe's old enemy. Strung up naked in the courtyard, Simmerson's mind is addled with the heat and he seems to only speak nonsense, such as "save the harvest." Major Joubert is not among the dead, to Marie-Angelique's relief, but neither are the Company ledgers that reveal what has been stolen from the fort. The Subedar dies.

Continuing on, the train finds a farming village destroyed by bandits, the entire harvest stolen, and everyone dead but a young girl who witnessed the attack. Between what the girl saw and Simmerson's addled ramblings, Sharpe realises that not only were these people growing opium for the Company, but Colonel Count Dragomirov and Major Joubert were responsible for the slaughter in the village and at Kalimgong, using bandits as scapegoats.

The train is forced to leave mounts and wagons behind when the bridge over a river is found to be destroyed. While crossing, they are attacked by Dragomirov and his men. Joubert grabs Marie-Angelique and rides off with her. Sharpe tries to pursue, but Wormwood uses the chaos to try to kill Sharpe, managing only to wound him in the shoulder. Harper drags Sharpe to safety.

Dragomirov's troops retreat. Once his wound is treated, Sharpe takes a horse and leaves to rescue Marie-Angelique, putting Harper in command of the train. When Sharpe finds Joubert, they fight. The weakened Sharpe is disarmed, but Marie-Angelique shoots and kills Joubert with his own pistol. However, Dragomirov's cavalry find them and take them to their field headquarters on the Indian plains. Meanwhile, during the night, the seriously wounded Tredinnick sneaks away, as he is slowing down the train. He tries to ambush Dragomirov, but his shot misses, and Dragomirov stabs him and leaves him for dead. Lance Naik Singh (Raza Jaffrey) finds Tredinnick and hears his dying words: Dragomirov's lie that Sharpe is dead.

Dragomirov shows Sharpe around his field headquarters, where Indian slaves produce opium. He offers Sharpe Joubert's position and promises to keep Sharpe's people prisoner rather than kill them, but Sharpe turns him down. Later, Dragomirov threatens to give Marie-Angelique, who has been dosed with opium, to his men, so Sharpe agrees to lead Dragomirov to the train and convince Harper to surrender. During the night, Dragomirov has Sharpe chained in a pit with cobras, but he gets free, rescues Marie-Angelique, and catches up with the train. Dragomirov follows, but Sharpe uses gunpowder to create a roadblock.

When the train comes to a village, Mrs. Tredinnick goes into labour. Sharpe has no choice but to stop and defend the place. He gets the village's leader, the real Chitu (Ulhas Tayade) and the rest of the residents on-side for the upcoming battle. Singh repairs a very old cannon. Wormwood wants to desert, but his two cronies decide to fight alongside Sharpe. That night, Sharpe apologises to Barabbas for his earlier treatment and agrees to let him fight, but later, Wormwood frees Barabbas and tells him that Sharpe plans to execute him in the morning. Both Barabbas and Wormwood ride away separately. Wormwood joins Dragomirov and tells him all about Sharpe's defences.

When Dragomirov attacks the next day, Sharpe's men resist strongly. Beauclere is fatally wounded while defending the women. Wormwood kills one of his former comrades (with the other also perishing in the battle), but Harper kills him in a hand-to-hand fight. At the last moment, British cavalry soldiers arrive, led by Barabbas, who had ridden the entire night to bring  reinforcements. Sharpe duels Dragomirov and kills him.

After the battle, Sharpe says his goodbyes to Marie-Angelique, who talks of visiting Sharpe's farm in Normandy, and to Simmerson, with whom he has an almost-friendly conversation, before he and Harper ride off for home.

Cast 
 Sean Bean - Colonel Richard Sharpe
 Velibor Topic - Col. Count Vladimir Dragomirov
 Daragh O'Malley - Sergeant Major Patrick Harper
 Beatrice Rosen - Marie-Angelique Bonnet
 Raza Jaffrey - Lance Naik Singh
 Steve Speirs - Colour Sergeant Silas Wormwood
 Nandana Sen - Maharani Padmini
 Chucky Venice - Private Daniel Deever
 Michael Cochrane - Sir Henry Simmerson
 Caroline Carver - Mrs Tredinnick
 Pascal Langdale - Major Philippe Joubert
 Rajesh Khatar - Subedar Pillai
 Jonathan Moore - Reverend Watkin
 David Robb - Major Tredinnick
 Luke Ward-Wilkinson - Ensign the Hon. Percival Beauclere
 Amit Behl - Corporal Barabbas Hakeswill
 Ryan Pope - Private Joshua Quilter
 Jonny Coyne - Private Croop
 David Henry - Viscount Sedgefield

Production history 
At a book signing in Bath on 11 October 2006, Bernard Cornwell revealed that there were plans by ITV to film two more episodes. When asked about the stories, Cornwell said that he believed that they were producing two new stories specially for television.  Filming of Sharpe's Peril, produced by Celtic Film/Picture Palace/Duke Street Films, began on 3 March 2008 in India (in Orchha and Khajuraho), and finished in late April.
The film was created both as a 2 x 90 minute version (circa 2 x 69 minutes without adverts, i.e. 138 minutes in total) and a single 100 minute version.

UK broadcast history 
Part one was first aired on ITV and UTV on 2 November 2008 and part two on 9 November 2008, although STV, the holders of the Northern and Central Scottish licensees of ITV, decided not to screen Sharpe's Peril, but instead use the time slots for its own drama Missing from 2006.

Sharpe's Peril was released on DVD on 10 November 2008 in the UK. This 2 disc set comes with both versions of Sharpe's Peril. There has also been a making-of documentary produced for Sharpe's Peril, which is included on the DVD, and was shown on ITV3 after the main show had finished on 9 November.

Reception 
DVDTalk.com gave it 4 out of 5 stars, calling it "a dramatic improvement over its predecessor, Sharpe's Challenge (2006)."

References

External links 
 
 Sharpe's Peril at Sharpe Film official website
 Sharpe's Peril at South Essex.co.uk
 Celtic Films
 Picture Palace website about Sharpe's Peril

2008 British television episodes
2000s historical films
2000s war films
ITV television dramas
Peril
English-language television shows
Napoleonic Wars naval films
War television films
Fiction set in 1818
Films directed by Tom Clegg (director)